Sippie Tigchelaar (born 11 July 1952) is a retired speed skater from the Netherlands who was active between 1969 and 1975. She competed at the 1972 Winter Olympics in the 3000 m and finished in fourth place. She had gradually improved her position in the national all-round championships from eighth place in 1972 to third in 1973, second in 1974, and first in 1975.

Personal bests:
500 m – 45.91 (1975)
 1000 m – 1:31.44 (1975)
 1500 m – 2:19.5 (1975)
 3000 m – 4:41.01 (1975)

Since 2007 she is a member of the national skating federation (KNSB); in 2010 she was re-elected for another three years. In 2012, she became a member of the Order of Orange-Nassau. She lives in Wolvega.

References

1952 births
Living people
Dutch female speed skaters
Speed skaters at the 1972 Winter Olympics
Olympic speed skaters of the Netherlands
Recipients of the Order of Orange-Nassau
Sportspeople from Friesland
People from Franekeradeel
20th-century Dutch women
21st-century Dutch women